Herman Maxwell Batten (August 4, 1909October 17, 1991) was a Canadian politician, school principal and teacher.

Born in Bareneed, Conception Bay, Newfoundland, he was elected to the House of Commons of Canada in 1953 as a Member of the Liberal Party to represent the riding of Humber—St. George's and re-elected in the elections of 1957, 1958, 1962, 1963, 1965 and he was defeated in the election of 1968 in the riding of Humber—St. George's—St. Barbe. He was Deputy Chair of Committees of the Whole between 1963 and 1965 and Chairperson of the Special Committee on a Canadian flag.  He was Deputy Speaker and Chairman of Committees of the Whole of the House of Commons between 1966 and 1968.

References

1909 births
1991 deaths
Liberal Party of Canada MPs
Members of the House of Commons of Canada from Newfoundland and Labrador